The third season of Love Games: Bad Girls Need Love Too premiered on December 5, 2011, with Tanisha Thomas returning as the host. The season ran for eight episodes and concluded on January 23, 2012.

Format
Alumni from previous seasons of The Bad Girls Club are "looking for the man of their dreams." For season three,  Three "bad girls" have a choice of 13 bachelors to explore love, friendships, etc. The bad girls are Sydney and Kori from Season 6 and Judi from Season 7. Each week features a variety of challenges. The "bad girls" battle it out and compete to be the "HBIC" - Head Bad Girl In Charge. Instead of season 1 with each "bad girl" choosing who is up for elimination, the "HBIC" chooses who is up for elimination.

Cast

"Bad Girls"

Contestants

Game History

 The contestant is the Bad Girl
 The contestant is a male
 This contestant was the HBIC
 This contestant was put in the bottom 3 by the HBIC
 This contestant was eliminated

Episodes

References

External links
 

2011 American television seasons
2012 American television seasons